James Pickford (born 30 April 1979 in Macclesfield, Cheshire) is a British race car driver. As a child his interest was in motorbikes; his father Keith ran bike racing teams. James started at the beginning in karts in 1994. For a while he was coached by former BTCC racer Tim Sugden. His interest in saloon and sportscars began when he lost a test in a BTCC car after being nominated for the BRDC McLaren Autosport Young Driver of the Year award in 1998.

His start in motor racing was in 1997, in the Formula Honda series. He won this 2 years in a row, and also did a single Formula Ford race in 1998.

After a year working on marketing within the prestigious Abt Sportsline team in the DTM, he returned to full-time racing in 2003, in the  SEAT Cupra Championship. He was fifth overall, but improved to win the title in 2004, with 11 top-four finishes in the 12 races including 3 wins. This earned him a factory British Touring Car Championship SEAT drive in 2005. He came ninth in the series, with a podium at Snetterton  but did not retain the drive for 2006. For 2007 he contested the full Porsche Carrera Cup GB, having done the later races in 2006, starting at Knockhill. This means he has contested three of the five championships which support the BTCC and feature on ITV's Motorsport UK programme, as well as the BTCC itself.

Racing record

Complete British Touring Car Championship results
(key) (Races in bold indicate pole position – 1 point awarded just in first race) (Races in italics indicate fastest lap – 1 point awarded all races) (* signifies that driver lead race for at least one lap – 1 point awarded all races)

Complete British GT Championship results
(key) (Races in bold indicate pole position in class) (Races in italics indicate fastest lap in class)

External links
 James Pickford official website

British Touring Car Championship drivers
English racing drivers
1979 births
Living people
Formula Palmer Audi drivers
Sportspeople from Macclesfield
Porsche Supercup drivers
Porsche Carrera Cup GB drivers
Cupra Racing drivers